Pickwick may refer to:

Arts 

The Pickwick Papers, a novel by Charles Dickens
 Samuel Pickwick, its main character
Pickwick (operetta), 1889 one-act operetta by Edward Solomon and F. C. Burnand, based on part of the Dickens novel
Pickwick (musical), a theatre musical based on the Dickens novel
Pickwick (film), a 1969 British TV film, based on the musical
Pickwick Theatre, Park Ridge, Illinois, United States
Pickwick, a fictional dodo in the novels about Thursday Next by Jasper Fforde

Music 
Pickwick (band), an American rock band
Pickwick Records, a record label, distributor and chain.

Places 
Pickwick, Minnesota, United States
Pickwick, Wiltshire, now part of Corsham, England
Pickwick Dam, Tennessee, an unincorporated community in the United States
Pickwick Island, an island near Antarctica
Pickwick Landing State Park, Tennessee, United States
Pickwick Landing Dam, Tennessee, United States
Pickwick Lake, Tennessee, United States

Other uses 
Pickwick Corporation, a defunct California business; bus line, manufacturer of early buses, hotels
Pickwick (brand), a tea brand
Pickwick (West Whiteland Township, Pennsylvania), a historic estate home
Pickwick Cricket Club, Barbados
Pickwick Mill, in Pickwick, Minnesota
Pickwick Video Group, a home video division based in the United Kingdom first established in 1982
Pickwickian syndrome, a medical disease named from the Dickens novel
Don Pickwick (1925–2004), Welsh footballer
Eleazer Pickwick (1748 or 1749–1837), British businessman

See also 
 The Pickwick Papers (disambiguation)